Daniel Licht (March 13, 1957 – August 2, 2017) was an American soundtrack composer and musician, best known for writing the score of Showtime TV drama series Dexter.

Life and career
Licht grew up in suburban Detroit and attended the Roeper School, as well as summer school at Berklee College of Music in Boston. He started playing music at the age of eight with his first instrument being the clarinet.  He took up the guitar four years later. He began his musical career while still in high school playing guitar with a small jazz ensemble at clubs in the area. Following high school graduation, he attended Hampshire College in Massachusetts and graduated in composition, jazz and world music. Licht moved to New York City and established himself as a musical artist in the Lower East Side creative music scene. He would travel to Germany, the Netherlands and Northern Europe to perform and compose music for theatre and dance companies. He created scores for such companies as Mercedes Benz, Sony and AT&T

He then moved to Los Angeles and pursued a career in film scoring, at the suggestion of his former classmate, Christopher Young. His first major project was the 1991 feature film Children of the Night. His composition earned him his first soundtrack CD release.

Licht scored all seasons of Dexter, which he considered to be one of his "more visible projects", but was reluctant to refer to it as his big break.

From 2012 to 2015 he was the main composer of the Silent Hill video game series, replacing Akira Yamaoka, until Konami decided to pull away from the home console video game industry, effectively ending the Silent Hill series. He also composed the soundtrack for the 2012 video game Dishonored and its 2016 sequel. Dishonored: Death of the Outsider (for which he also composed and was released posthumously) was dedicated to his memory.

Licht died of sarcoma at his home in Topanga, California, at the age of 60.

Licht was assisted by his nephew Jon for his work on Dexter, Dishonored, and Silent Hill.

Works

Film

Television series

Video games

References

External links

1957 births
2017 deaths
American film score composers
American television composers
Silent Hill
Video game composers
Hampshire College alumni
American male film score composers
Male television composers
Musicians from Detroit
Deaths from cancer in California